Languages in Contrast is a peer-reviewed academic journal of contrastive linguistics established in 1998 and published biannually by John Benjamins Publishing Company. Focusing on comparative studies of two or multiple languages, it covers all subfields of both theoretical and applied linguistics, such as morphology, phonology, discourse analysis, language education, etc.

The current editors-in-chief are Signe Oksefjell Ebeling and Hilde Hasselgård (University of Oslo).

Abstracting and indexing 
The journal is abstracted and indexed in:
 International Bibliography of Book Reviews of Scholarly Literature and Social Sciences/International Bibliography of Periodical Literature
 Linguistic Bibliography/Bibliographie Linguistique
 Linguistics & Language Behavior Abstracts
 European Reference Index for the Humanities

References

External links 
 

Linguistics journals
John Benjamins academic journals
English-language journals
Biannual journals
Publications established in 1998